The Best of Keane is the first official compilation album by British group Keane. It was released on 11 November 2013 through Island Records. The album contains all of the singles from the band's first four studio albums, Hopes and Fears, Under the Iron Sea, Perfect Symmetry and Strangeland (with the exception of "The Lovers Are Losing" and "Better Than This", which are replaced by "My Shadow" from the Night Train EP and "Hamburg Song" from Under the Iron Sea), plus two new songs: "Higher Than the Sun" and "Won't Be Broken", written during the Strangeland era. The deluxe version of the album includes a second disc with all B-sides (excluding "She Opens Her Eyes" from This Is the Last Time, "Untitled 2" from Bedshaped, "Tyderian" from Nothing in My Way and some covers, remixes and live releases) and an unreleased song titled "Russian Farmer's Song".

Background

The purpose of the compilation album is to celebrate the first 10 years of Keane's career, which began with the release of their first commercial single with Fierce Panda Records, "Everybody's Changing", in 2003. It is the first compilation album ever released by the band.

Promotion

The album is promoted by the single "Higher Than the Sun", which first aired on Chris Evans' BBC Radio 2 show on 27 September 2013, and was released digitally on 28 September 2013.

Track listing

Charts

Weekly charts

Year-end charts

Certifications

References 

2013 greatest hits albums
Island Records compilation albums
Keane (band) albums